Joanna Charrington is a music industry executive, widely regarded as one of the most influential and successful female A&R executives in British Music history.  She is currently Co-President of EMI Records and President of Capitol Records in the UK. Her industry career began at London Records in 1992 as a marketing assistant before moving to Virgin Records in the International Department, then BMG working for the President Jeremy Marsh.

Career
Charrington left her job at BMG in 1996 to put together and manage the RnB boyband Another Level, alongside John Reid (Elton John/Queen). She later signed them to Nick Raphael and Christian Tattersfield at Northwestside Records, a newly formed subsidiary of BMG. The band enjoyed multiple top 10 singles including the Number 1 ‘Freak Me’, as well as a platinum debut album in the UK.

After Reid left the management business, Charrington joined up with Simon Fuller. After 5 years in management she was approached by her old London Records colleague and Northwestside Records founder Nick Raphael to join him at Epic Records, a division of Sony Music. The duo worked together for 14 years, 10 of which at Sony, before moving to Universal to restart London Records, now Capitol UK.

Artists discovered or signed by Jo Charrington
Charrington, alongside Raphael, has signed and launched a diverse number of platinum and multi-platinum selling artists, including;
 5 Seconds of Summer at Capitol.
 Sam Smith at Capitol
 Aloe Blacc at Epic.
 Big Brovaz at Epic
 Charlotte Church at Epic.
 G4 at Epic.
 Imogen Heap at Epic.
 JLS at Epic.
 Lemar at Epic.
 Mylo at Epic
 Olly Murs at Epic.
 Paloma Faith at Epic.
 The Priests at Epic.
 Russell Watson at Epic.
 Scouting For Girls at Epic.

Awards and nominations
Charrington's artists and writers have won multiple Grammys, BRITs, American Music Awards, Ivor Novellos and MOBOs.

Charrington, along with Raphael, was awarded the Music Week A&R Award in both 2010 and 2015.

Charrington has been invited to take part in a mentoring scheme set up by Marie Claire magazine to inspire and educate the future generation of the music industry.

In 2015, she was named Business Woman of the Year at the 2015 Music Week’s Women in Music awards.

Charrington was appointed a Governor of the Brit School on 1 January 2016

References

British music industry executives
Living people
1970 births